Yury Sergeevitch Saulsky was a Soviet and Russian composer, author. His works as a film composer include the score for A Glass of Water.

External links
Yury Saulsky's Biography and Filmography at peoples.ru

1928 births
2003 deaths
Burials at Vagankovo Cemetery
Musicians from Moscow
Russian composers
Russian male composers
People's Artists of the RSFSR
Recipients of the Order of Friendship of Peoples
20th-century Russian male musicians